James Stott may refer to:
 Jimmy Stott, English footballer 
 James Stott (trade unionist), British trade union leader
 Jim Stott, English rugby league footballer